Li Yuanbo (born ) is a Chinese male volleyball player. He is part of the China men's national volleyball team. On club level he plays for Henan.

References

External links
 Profile at FIVB.org

1995 births
Living people
Chinese men's volleyball players
Place of birth missing (living people)
Volleyball players at the 2018 Asian Games
Asian Games competitors for China
21st-century Chinese people